Eurhodope is a genus of snout moths. It was described by Jacob Hübner in 1825.

Species
 Eurhodope cinerea (Staudinger, 1879)
 Eurhodope cirrigerella (Zincken, 1818)
 Eurhodope confusella (Walker, 1866)
 Eurhodope cruentella Duponchel, 1842
 Eurhodope incensella Staudinger, 1859
 Eurhodope incompta Zeller, 1847
 Eurhodope infixella (Walker, 1866)
 Eurhodope monogrammos Zeller, 1867
 Eurhodope notulella (Ragonot, 1888)
 Eurhodope nyctosia Balinsky, 1991
 Eurhodope rosella Scopoli, 1763

References

Phycitini
Pyralidae genera